Edward Arthur Murphy was a Dunlop researcher credited with the invention of latex foam, first marketed as Dunlopillo.

Career 

Murphy worked for Dunlop in Birmingham, UK.  He is listed as an inventor on more than 40 patents.

Awards and Recognitions

 1929 - Invented Dunlopillo latex, used as pad seats in public trams, trains, trolley buses and cockpits
 1931 - Invented first latex mattress
 1949 - Colwyn medal
 1966 - Charles Goodyear Medal from the ACS Rubber Division

References 

Polymer scientists and engineers